Hot R&B/Hip-Hop Songs is a chart published by Billboard that ranks the top-performing songs in the United States in African-American-oriented musical genres; the chart has undergone various name changes since its launch in 1942 to reflect the evolution of such genres.  In 1983, it was published under the title Black Singles.  During that year, 13 different singles topped the chart, based on playlists submitted by radio stations and surveys of retail sales outlets.

In the issue of Billboard dated January 1, "Sexual Healing" by Marvin Gaye was at number one, its ninth week in the top spot.  It spent one further week atop the chart for a total of ten weeks at number one, the longest-running chart-topper on the listing since 1962.  Gaye's track was replaced at number one in the issue dated January 15 by "The Girl Is Mine" by Michael Jackson and Paul McCartney.  It was the first of three number ones for Jackson in the first half of the year, all taken from his album Thriller, regarded as the best-selling album of all time.  "The Girl Is Mine" spent three weeks at number one and after one week out of the top spot, Jackson returned to number one in the issue dated February 12 with "Billie Jean".  This track spent nine consecutive weeks at number one, the longest chart-topping run of 1983.  Not until 1994 would another song spend as long atop the chart.  The track has been included on various lists of the greatest songs of all time, including the Rock and Roll Hall of Fame's 500 Songs That Shaped Rock and Roll. Jackson spent one further week at number one in May with "Beat It"; he was the only act with more than one number one during the year and his total of 13 weeks in the top spot was the highest of any act.

Several acts topped the chart in 1983 for the first time, beginning with McCartney in January.  In April, George Clinton achieved his first solo number one with "Atomic Dog"; he had previously experienced considerable success in the 1970s as the leader of the Parliament-Funkadelic collective.  The track was replaced in the top spot by "Candy Girl", the debut single by teenaged vocal group New Edition.  The group Mtume gained its first number one with "Juicy Fruit", which had the year's second-longest run in the top spot, spending eight weeks in the peak position.  Finally, family vocal group DeBarge topped the chart for the first time in December with "Time Will Reveal", which was the final number one of 1983.  Jackson's "Billie Jean" and "Beat It" also topped Billboards pop chart, the Hot 100, as did "All Night Long (All Night)" by Lionel Richie.

Chart history

See also 
1983 in music 
List of Billboard Hot 100 number-one singles of 1983

References

Works cited

1983
1983 record charts
1983 in American music